US Post Office—Lancaster is a historic post office building located at Lancaster in Erie County, New York. It was designed and built 1938–1939, and is one of a number of post offices in New York State designed by the Office of the Supervising Architect of the Treasury Department, Louis A. Simon.  The building is in the Colonial Revival style. The interior features a mural by Arthur Getz painted in 1940 and titled "Early Commerce in the Erie Canal Region."

It was listed on the National Register of Historic Places in 1989.

References

External links
US Post Office-Lancaster - U.S. National Register of Historic Places on Waymarking.com
Western New York Heritage Press: Lancaster, NY Post Office Mural photo

Lancaster
Government buildings completed in 1939
Colonial Revival architecture in New York (state)
Lancaster
National Register of Historic Places in Erie County, New York